Swabi District is a district in the Mardan Division of the Khyber Pakhtunkhwa province in Pakistan. It lies between the Indus and Kabul Rivers. Before becoming a district in 1988, it was a tehsil within the Mardan District. % of the population speaks Pashto as their first language.

Demographics
At the time of the 2017 census the district had a population of 1,625,477, of which 815,828 were males and 809,550 females. Rural population was 1,349,513 (83.02%) while the urban population was 275,964 (16.98%). The literacy rate was 59.06% - the male literacy rate was 73.99% while the female literacy rate was 44.35%. 1,086 people in the district were from religious minorities.

The population of the district over the years is shown in the table below.

At the time of the 2017 census, 95.49% of the population spoke Pashto and 2.93% Hindko as their first language.

Education 
Swabi District is now home to many excellent educational institutes. But there was no public sector university until 2012. The only degree awarding institution then was private sector Ghulam Ishaq Khan Institute of Engineering Sciences and Technology, which was inaugurated in 1993. In 2012, the Government of Khyber Pakhtunkhawa established the first public sector university in Swabi, when it upgraded Abdul Wali Khan University Mardan Swabi campus into full-flege University of Swabi while Women University Swabi was established in 2016. Swabi district also has a public sector medical college Gajju Khan Medical College Swabi, which was established in 2014.

The district also has 2 public sector Postgraduate degree colleges: Government Postgraduate College Swabi and Govt Girls Post Graduate College Maneri Swabi.

Administration 
Swabi District is currently subdivided into 4 Tehsils.
 Swabi Tehsil
 Topi Tehsil
 Lahor Tehsil
 Razar Tehsil

Provincial Assembly

Newspaper in Swabi 
Currently there are couple of newspaper publishing in Swabi under the supervision of the Swabi Group of Newspapers.
 Swabi Times, a weekly publishing newspaper in Urdu.
 Swabi News, a daily publishing newspaper in Urdu.

Notable people
 
 
 Najib ad-Dawlah - A main combatant  of Third Battle of Panipat
 Haroon Bacha - Pashtun singer, musician, and composer
 Mufti Fareed – Islamic scholar
 Ali Gohar - scholar and restorative justice expert and founder of Just Peace Initiatives
 Bushra Gohar - Politician and Pashtun human rights activist
 Maulana Fazal Ali Haqqani - Minister of Education and member of the NWFP Assembly (then) now Khyber Pakhtunkhwa Assembly from 2002 to 2007
 Sardar Ali Haqqani - Islamic scholar
 Gulalai Ismail - Pashtun human rights activist
 Nigar Johar - Major General, Pakistan Army
 Gaju Khan - A historical pashtun rebel chief and general
 Junaid Khan - Cricketer
 Karnal Sher Khan - Military officer
 Khan Roshan Khan - Historian
 Muhammad Arshad Khan - Artist
 Shahram Khan - Politician 
 Taskeen Manerwal, Pashto poet
 Asad Qaiser - Speaker of National Assembly 
 Sahibzada Abdul Qayyum - First Chief Minister of the North-West Frontier Province (in 1937) and founder of Islamia College University
 Yasir Shah - Cricketer

References

Bibliography 

 
Districts of Khyber Pakhtunkhwa